Agnes of Baden may refer to:

 Agnes of Baden, Duchess of Carinthia (1250–1295), German noblewoman, Duchess of Carinthia and Countess of Heunburg
 Agnes of Baden, Countess of Holstein-Rendsburg (1408–1473), German noblewoman, Countess of Holstein-Rendsburg

See also 
 Agnes Baden-Powell (1858–1945), sister of Robert Baden-Powell, 1st Baron Baden-Powell